Ludwig Feuerbach and the End of Classical German Philosophy (German: Ludwig Feuerbach und der Ausgang der klassischen deutschen Philosophie) is a book published by Friedrich Engels in 1886. 

According to Engels, the seed for this book was planted 40 years before, in The German Ideology written by Marx and Engels, but unpublished in their lifetime. The undertaking is performed to deal critically with German philosophy from a dialectical materialist position. Here Engels emphasized the importance of Georg Wilhelm Friedrich Hegel and Ludwig Feuerbach for their own theories.

Hegel's idealist, conservative system must be distinguished from his materialist, revolutionary method of dialectics. Feuerbach had turned to law against Hegel's idealistic system and "the fundamental question of philosophy": the relation of thinking and being. But Feuerbach rejected Hegel's dialectical method, which is why his view of man and nature remained abstract and unhistorical. Marx only kept the "rational" content from the dialectical method and freed it from their idealistic form.

Publication history 
The book was only about 50 pages long, and was written early in 1886, and published that year in "Die Neue Zeit", issues No. 4 and 5. In 1888 a revised print by Johann Heinrich Wilhelm Dietz was published in Stuttgart, which contained some additional commentary by Engels. In this edition, Marx' 1845 Theses on Feuerbach  was also reprinted for the first time. The first English translation by Austin Lewis was published in the United States in 1903 by Charles H. Kerr & Company.

External links 
 Ludwig Feuerbach and the End of Classical German Philosophy, MEW 21, pp. 259–307.
 Ludwig Feuerbach and the End of Classical German Philosophy to marxists.org

1886 non-fiction books
Books by Friedrich Engels
German philosophy
Marxist books
Dialectical materialism